Sod in the Seed is an EP by American band Why?. It was released by City Slang in Europe on August 13, 2012, and by Anticon in North America on August 14, 2012. A music video was created for the title track.

Critical reception
Ian Cohen of Pitchfork gave the EP a 5.2 out of 10, describing it as "a regression rather than a rightful claim to what's theirs" that "benefits from the sketch-like character of its remaining songs."

Mike Diver of BBC listed it as one of the six best EPs of 2012.

Track listing

Personnel
Credits adapted from liner notes.

 Yoni Wolf – music, production, recording, mixing, artwork
 Josiah Wolf – music, production, recording
 Doug McDiarmid – music
 Liz Wolf – vocals
 Stephan Beall – violin, viola
 Brandon Stewart – French horn
 Stephen Carroll – vocals (6)
 Nicholas Garza – vocals (6)
 Amy Golden – vocals (6)
 Nathan Goodrich – vocals (6)
 Megan Hoggarth – vocals (6)
 Brittni Kelly – vocals (6)
 Elizabeth Knight – vocals (6)
 Kevin Bole – engineering assistance
 Justin Collins – engineering assistance
 Michael Earley – engineering assistance
 James Kang – engineering assistance
 Matt Moermond – engineering assistance
 Brent 'Snake' Benedict – recording
 Graham Marsh – mixing
 John Horesco IV – mastering
 Chris Simmons – layout

References

External links
 

2012 EPs
Why? (American band) albums
Anticon EPs